Tsuruyo Kondo  (November 16, 1901 – August 9, 1970) was a Japanese politician.

Biography 
Kondo was born in Niimi, Okayama prefecture on November 16, 1901. In 1924 she graduated from the Japan Women's University and began working at two schools in Okayama, the Sanyo Koto Jogakko and the Okayama-ken Daiichi Okayama Koto Jogakko. She taught manners and home economics.

After World War II, Kondo's brother, a politician affiliated with the Japan Progressive Party named Kotani Setsuo, was purged in 1946.  This purge prevented him from running for office. Kondo ran in his stead without a party to represent Okayama prefecture in the House of Representatives. She was one of the first female politicians in post-war Japan. After she was elected, she became a member of the Liberal Party, then the Democratic Liberal Party, and then the Freedom Party. In 1948, she was selected to become the Parliamentary Vice-Minister in Shigeru Yoshida's cabinet.

Kondo was elected four times, until she lost the 1953 and 1955 elections. She returned to politics when she was elected to the House of Councillors in 1956, representing Okayama prefecture. Kondo aligned herself with 's faction within the Liberal Democratic Party. After Masa Nakayama, Kondo was the second woman ever appointed to the Japanese cabinet. 

Kondo retired from politics in 1968. She died in 1970 at the age of 68.

Further reading

References 

1970 deaths
1901 births
People from Okayama Prefecture
Female members of the House of Representatives (Japan)
Female members of the House of Councillors (Japan)
Members of the House of Councillors (Japan)
Women government ministers of Japan
Pages with unreviewed translations
Japan Women's University alumni
Democratic Liberal Party (Japan) politicians
Members of the House of Representatives (Japan)
20th-century Japanese politicians
20th-century Japanese women politicians